The Chola invasion of Kalinga in 1110 CE was the second and more famous of the two campaigns against the kingdom of Kalinga undertaken during the reign of Kulothunga I. The forces led by the Pallava chief, Karunakara Tondaiman, achieved an easy victory over the army of Kalinga forcing its king, Anantavarman Chodaganga to flee. The war and its causes form the subject of the ballad, Kalingattuparani.

Causes 
The kingdom of Kalinga had been subdued in the first Chola invasion of Kalinga and the king had become a vassal of the Cholas paying an annual tribute to the Chola Emperor. When the king of Kalinga, Anantavarman Chodaganga defaulted on payment for two years in a row, Kulothunga Chola I declared a war on him and appointed his Prime Minister and Commander-in-chief, Karunakara Tondaiman to lead an expedition to Kalinga.

Events 
Karunakara Tondaiman set out from Kanchipuram in 1110 and crossing the Palar, Pennar, Krishna and Godavari, reached Kalinga. After destroying the elephant corps sent by Anantavarman to arrest his advance, Karunakara Tondaiman plundered and ravaged Kalinga. Anantavarman faced the Chola Army on the battlefield but was defeated and had to flee.

See also 
 Chola invasion of Kalinga (1097)

Notes

References 
 

Conflicts in 1110
Military campaigns involving the Chola Empire
1110 in Asia
12th century in India